Georg Wieter (10 March 1896 – 20 March 1988) was a German operatic and concert bass singer.

Life 
Born in Hannover, Wieter completed his singing studies in Hanover. From 1924 to 1935 he was engaged at the Staatstheater Nürnberg where he took part in the world premiere of the opera Der Tag im Licht by Hans Grimm in 1930. In 1935 he was engaged as a permanent member of the ensemble at the Bavarian State Opera, to which he belonged until his stage farewell in 1967.

Wieter, the first to play bass and bass-buffo in the opera Der Friedenstag (1938), Capriccio (1942) by Richard Strauss as well as Der Mond (1939) by Carl Orff in Munich. Wieter was also a sought-after concert singer.

Wieter died in Munich at age 92.

Awards 
 1964: Bavarian Order of Merit

Further reading 
 Karl-Josef Kutsch, Leo Riemens: Unvergängliche Stimmen. Francke, 1975 , .
 Walther Killy and Rudolf Vierhaus (edit.): Deutsche Biographische Enzyklopädie. Volume 10. K.G. Saur publisher & Co. KG, München 1996, .

External links 
 

German operatic basses
20th-century German  male opera singers
1896 births
1988 deaths
Musicians from Hanover